The .32 S&W Long, also known as 7.65x23mm, is a straight-walled, centerfire, rimmed handgun cartridge, based on the earlier .32 S&W cartridge. It was introduced in 1896 for Smith & Wesson's first-model Hand Ejector revolver. Colt called it the .32 Colt New Police in revolvers it made chambered for the cartridge.

History

The .32 S&W Long was introduced in 1896 with the company's first hand ejector revolver. The .32 Long is simply a lengthened version of the earlier .32 S&W. The hand ejector design has evolved some, but with its swing out cylinder on a crane, has been the basis for every S&W revolver designed since. In 1896, the cartridge was loaded with black powder. In 1903 the small hand ejector was updated with a new design. The cartridge stayed the same, but was now loaded with smokeless powder to roughly the same chamber pressure.

When he was the New York City Police Commissioner, Theodore Roosevelt standardized the department's use of the Colt New Police revolver. The cartridge was then adopted by several other northeastern U.S. police departments. The .32 Long is well known as an unusually accurate cartridge. This reputation led Police Commissioner Roosevelt to select it as an expedient way to increase officers' accuracy with their revolvers in New York City. The Colt company referred to the .32 S&W Long cartridge as the .32 "Colt's New Police" cartridge, concurrent with the conversion of the Colt New Police revolver from .32 Long Colt. The cartridges are functionally identical with the exception that the .32 NP cartridge has been historically loaded with a flat nosed bullet as opposed to the round nose of the .32 S&W Long.

Current use
In the United States, it is usually older revolvers which are chambered in this caliber. The cartridge has mostly fallen out of use due to smaller revolvers chambered in .38 Special being more effective for self-defense. The cartridge is widely used internationally, particularly in countries like India that restrict the calibers available to civilian firearms owners. Revolvers are still produced in this caliber in South America, South Asia, and Eastern Europe.

The .32 S&W Long is popular among international competitors in ISSF 25 meter center-fire pistol, using high-end target pistols from makers such as Pardini Arms, Morini, Hämmerli, Benelli, and Walther, among others, but chambered for wadcutter bullet type.  The sporting variant of the Manurhin MR 73, also known as MR 32, is also chambered in .32 S&W Long.

The IOF .32 Revolver manufactured by the Ordnance Factories Organization in India for civilian licence holders is chambered for this cartridge.

Interchangeability
The .32 S&W Long headspaces on the rim and shares the rim dimensions and case and bullet diameters of the shorter .32 S&W cartridge and the longer .32 H&R Magnum and .327 Federal Magnum cartridges.  The shorter .32 S&W may be fired in handguns chambered for the .32 S&W Long; and the .32 S&W Long may be fired in arms chambered for the longer .32 H&R and .327 Federal magnums; although the longer cartridges should not fit and must not be fired in arms designed for the shorter and less powerful cartridges.

The .32 S&W Long and .32 Long Colt are not interchangeable. At one time it was widely publicized that these rounds would interchange, but in truth it has never been deemed safe to do so.

Gallery

See also
 8 mm caliber
 List of handgun cartridges
 S&W Model 30
 Table of handgun and rifle cartridges

References

Pistol and rifle cartridges
.32 S&W Long firearms
Smith & Wesson cartridges